Błażej Koniusz and Grzegorz Panfil won the title by defeating Kellen Damico and Nathaniel Schnugg 7–6(7–5), 6–3 in the final.

Seeds

Draw

Finals

Top half

Bottom half

Sources
Draw

Boys' Doubles
2006 Boys' Doubles